ITU School of Civil Engineering is the first faculty of Istanbul Technical University. Its foundation date is considered as the starting of the engineering education in Ottoman Empire.
Faculty has three divisions.
 Civil engineering
 Geomatic engineering
 Environmental engineering

Notable alumni 
 Prof.Dr.Mustafa İNAN
 Süleyman Demirel
 Oğuz Atay
 Prof.Dr.Nahit KUMBASAR
 Prof.Dr.Semih Salih Tezcan
 Recai Kutan

References

External links 
 ITU School of Civil Engineering
 Faculty E-Bulletin

Istanbul Technical University
Educational institutions established in 1727
Engineering universities and colleges in Turkey
1720s establishments in the Ottoman Empire